Musa (Moses;  1363–81) was a Serbian nobleman who served Emperor Stefan Uroš V (r. 1355–1371), with the title of čelnik. Musa married Dragana Lazarevic, the sister of Prince Lazar of Serbia. He is the founder of the Musić family, as father of Stefan, Lazar and Jovan. Jovan would later become the mytropolite of the Eparchy of Toplica.

The province governed by Musa stretched over the Kopaonik massif, between Ibar and Lab. Little is known about him. He is believed to have been born in ca. 1330 and married Dragana in 1355 at latest. First mentioned in 1363 when he was appointed as governor of Brvenik. Before 1363 Musa was governor of Zvečan. Musa was last mentioned in 1381, he died some time before 1388, when his son Stefan succeeded him.

References

Sources
 
 
 
 
 

14th-century Serbian nobility
People of the Serbian Empire
14th-century births
1380s deaths